Hugh Fenn may refer to:

 Hugh Fenn (died 1409), English official from Norfolk who served under Richard II and Henry IV
 Hugh Fenn (died 1476), English official from Norfolk who served under Henry VI and Edward IV